Ferencik is a surname. Notable people with the surname include:

 Erica Ferencik (born 1958), American novelist, screenwriter, and stand-up comedian
 Milan Ferenčík (born 1991), Slovak footballer
 Milan Ferenčík (born 1995), Slovak footballer